The Tarxien Temples are an archaeological complex in Tarxien, Malta. They date to approximately 3150 BC. The site was accepted as a UNESCO World Heritage Site in 1992 along with the other Megalithic temples on the island of Malta.

Description
The Tarxien Temples consist of three separate, but attached, temple structures. The main entrance is a reconstruction dating from 1956, when the whole site was restored. At the same time, many of the decorated slabs discovered on site were relocated indoors for protection at the Museum of Archaeology in Valletta. The first temple has been dated to approximately 3100 BC and is the most elaborately decorated of the temples of Malta. The middle temple dates to about 3000 BC, and is unique in that, unlike the rest of the Maltese temples, it has three pairs of apses instead of the usual two. The east temple is dated at around 3100 BC. The remains of another temple, smaller, and older, having been dated to 3250 BC, are visible further towards the east.

Of particular interest at the temple site is the rich and intricate stonework, which includes depictions of domestic animals carved in relief, altars, and screens decorated with spiral designs and other patterns. Demonstrative of the skill of the builders is a chamber set into the thickness of the wall between the South and Central temples and containing a relief showing a bull and a sow.

Function in prehistory
Excavation of the site reveals that it was used extensively for rituals, which probably involved animal sacrifice. Especially of interest at Tarxien is that stone rollers left outside the South temple were probably used for transporting the megaliths. Additionally, evidence of cremation has been found at the center of the South temple, which is an indicator that the site was reused as a Bronze Age cremation cemetery.

Discovery and history

The large stone blocks were discovered in 1914 by local farmers ploughing a field. After the accidental discovery 300 metres away of Ħal Saflieni Hypogeum in 1913, the proprietor of the land underneath which the temples were buried figured that the large stones that were continually struck by workers' ploughs may also have had some archaeological value. On that notion, he contacted the director of the National Museum, Themistocles Zammit, who began to dig even on his first inspection of the site, where he discovered the center of the temple compound. It was not long before Zammit found himself standing in what appeared to be an apse formed by a semicircle of enormous hewn stones. Over the course of three years, Zammit enlisted the help of local farmers and townspeople for an excavation project of unprecedented scale in Malta. By 1920, Zammit had identified and carried out restoration work on five separate but interconnected temples, all yielding a remarkable collection of artifacts, including the famous "fat lady" statue, a representation of a Mother Goddess or a fertility charm (according to the Malta Archaeological Museum, the "fat lady" statue is genderless, and could represent either a man or a woman) and several unique examples of prehistoric relief, including ships.

A small sample of artefacts from the site were donated by Zammit in 1923 to the British Museum. The temples were included on the Antiquities List of 1925. Further excavations at the temples were conducted in the post-World War II period under the directorship of J.G. Baldacchino.

Protective tent-like shelters, similar to those at Ħaġar Qim and Mnajdra, were built around the Tarxien Temples in 2015, and were completed in December of that year.

Significance
The discovery of the complex did much to further Malta's national identity, solidly confirming the existence of a thriving ancient culture on the island. Also, the general interest aroused by the finds engendered for the first time a public concern for the protection of Malta's historical treasures, including a need for management of the sites, the promulgation of laws, and other measures to protect and preserve monuments. At the same time, Themistocles' thorough method in excavating the site paved the way for a new scientific approach to archaeology.

Gallery

See also
List of megalithic sites

References

External links

Listing at UNESCO World Heritage Center
Official Tourist information
National Inventory of the Cultural Property of the Maltese Islands

4th-millennium BC establishments
World Heritage Sites in Malta
Megalithic Temples of Malta
Neolithic sites
Tarxien
1914 archaeological discoveries
National Inventory of the Cultural Property of the Maltese Islands
Sites managed by Heritage Malta